Abrostola asclepiadis is a moth of the family Noctuidae. It is found in South and Central Europe as far north as Finland and Sweden, Asia Minor and the Caucasus.

Technical description and variation

A. asclepiadis Schiff. Scarcely distinguishable in the imago state from triplasia L., but differing altogether in the larva; this is bluish white, tinged with green on the thoracic segments, dotted with black; the dorsal tubercles large; lateral stripe broadly yellow; on each segment above it a large black dot, beneath it two large black dots and several smaller ones; head greenish yellow, with black dots: in the ab. jagowi Bartel from the Engadine, the basal area is not tinged with pink and is without dark markings. The wingspan is 30–40 mm.

Biology
Adults are on wing from June to August depending on the location.

The larvae feed on Vincetoxicum hirundinaria, which contains toxic alkaloids and is unpalatable to most generalist herbivores.

References

External links

Article about food choice by larvae
Moths and Butterflies of Europe and North Africa
Lepiforum.de

Plusiinae
Moths of Europe
Moths of Asia
Taxa named by Michael Denis
Taxa named by Ignaz Schiffermüller
Moths described in 1775